This is a list of Japanese films that are scheduled to release in 2023.

Box office collection
The following is a list of the 10 highest-grossing Japanese films released at the Japanese box office during 2023.
*Last updated on 20 March 2023.

Released films

January – March

April - June

July - September

October - December

Upcoming

See also
 List of 2023 box office number-one films in Japan
 2023 in Japan
 2023 in Japanese television

References

External links
 

Film
2023
Lists of 2023 films by country or language